Kamil Zayatte (born 7 March 1985) is a Guinean former professional footballer who played as a defender. An RC Lens youth product, Zayatte's performances at Swiss club Young Boys earned him a loan move to Premier League club Hull City in 2008 which was later made permanent. Following a brief stint with Turkish side Konyaspor in the second half of the 2010–11 season, he joined Istanbul BB. In 2013 he returned to England signing with Sheffield Wednesday where he stayed for two seasons. His last club was Al Raed where he remained for half a season. In addition to his club career, Zayatte made 44 FIFA-official appearances for the Guinea national team.

Club career
Born in Conakry, Zayatte moved from Guinea to Paris, France at the age of fifteen. His first professional club was RC Lens, where he got to know future Hull City teammate Daniel Cousin. He only played in two games for Lens, one league and one cup, and moved to BSC Young Boys for more first-team opportunities.

In summer 2008, Zayatte had trials with Everton and Newcastle United, before joining Hull City on a season-long loan on 31 August. City had the option to sign him longer-term if they stayed in the Premier League. A deal made the transfer permanent for a fee that matched the club's then-record signing (£2.5 million for Anthony Gardner).

On 25 October 2008, Zayatte scored his first goal for Hull in a 3–0 win against West Bromwich Albion early in the second half, a volley from Dean Marney's right hand corner to maintain Hull's impressive start to the 2008–09 campaign.

On 23 January 2009, it was announced that Zayatte had signed permanently with Hull, on a reported three-year deal.

In September 2010, Zayatte was to sign for Leicester City, first permanently and then on a season-long loan with an optional view of a permanent deal. Leicester, however, pulled out of the deal citing regulatory issues.

On 18 January 2011, Zayatte was allowed to return to France on compassionate grounds, with Hull City retaining his playing registration in order to control any future compensation issues. On 24 January 2011, it was announced that he had signed a contract with Turkish club Konyaspor.

On 27 May 2011, Zayatte signed a three-year contract with İstanbul BB.

On 2 August 2013, Zayatte signed a two-year deal with Sheffield Wednesday subject to FIFA clearance. He scored his first goal for the club in the 17 August 2013 derby against Leeds United, which finished 1–1.
Zayatte was one of 11 players released by Sheffield Wednesday at the end of the 2014–15 season.

International career

He played with the national team in 2015 Africa Cup of Nations, where the team reached the quarter-finals.

International goals

References

External links

 Profile, stats and pictures of Kamil Zayatte
 
 
 

1985 births
Living people
Sportspeople from Conakry
Guinean footballers
Guinean expatriate footballers
Guinea international footballers
Association football defenders
Association football midfielders
Association football utility players
2008 Africa Cup of Nations players
2012 Africa Cup of Nations players
2015 Africa Cup of Nations players
Guinean Muslims
RC Lens players
BSC Young Boys players
Hull City A.F.C. players
Konyaspor footballers
İstanbul Başakşehir F.K. players
Sheffield Wednesday F.C. players
Al-Raed FC players
Ligue 1 players
Premier League players
English Football League players
Swiss Super League players
Süper Lig players
Saudi Professional League players
Expatriate footballers in England
Expatriate footballers in Switzerland
Expatriate footballers in Turkey
Guinean emigrants to France